Rose Nathike Lokonyen (born 24 February 1995) is a track and field athlete from South Sudan, but who later lived and trained in Kenya.

Early life 
Lokonyen was born in South Sudan. Her father is a soldier and she has four younger siblings. When she was 10, Lokonyen and her family fled on foot from soldiers in their village of Chukudum. The family then crowded into the back of a truck and made their way to Kakuma refugee camp in northwest Kenya. Her parents left the Kakuma in 2008 but left Lokonyen and her siblings at the refugee camp. When she reached high school, while still living in the refugee camp, Lokonyen began running as a pastime.

Career
The International Olympic Committee and Tegla Loroupe Foundation held races inside refugee camps as tryouts for possible participation in the 2016 Summer Olympics. Lokonyen first tried out, while running barefoot, at the 5,000 meter distance and won her race, allowing her advance to Ngong. She continued to train alongside other Olympic hopeful refugees in Ngong before being notified via a livestream from Geneva, Switzerland that she had been chosen to compete. She was coached by John Anzrah.

She was selected by the International Olympic Committee (IOC) to compete for the Refugee Olympic Team in the women's 800 m at the 2016 Summer Olympics in Rio de Janeiro, Brazil. The Refugee Olympic Team was the first in Olympic history. Lokonyen was one of five athletes on the refugee team born in South Sudan and was the team's flag bearer at the opening ceremony. Nathinke finished seventh in her first round heat with a time of 2:16.64. She did not advance. She also competed in the 2020 Tokyo olympics.

She trains with Tegla Loroupe, a Kenyan world record holding long-distance runner.

Competitions

References

1995 births
Living people
Place of birth missing (living people)
South Sudanese female middle-distance runners
South Sudanese refugees
Refugee Olympic Team at the 2016 Summer Olympics
Refugee Olympic Team at the 2020 Summer Olympics
Athletes (track and field) at the 2016 Summer Olympics
South Sudanese expatriate sportspeople in Kenya
Athlete Refugee Team at the World Athletics Championships
Athletes (track and field) at the 2020 Summer Olympics
Refugees in Kenya
People from Eastern Equatoria